Nick Leather is a British screenwriter and playwright, best known as the creator of the drama series The Control Room for BBC One, as well as the CBBC children's series Rocket's Island.

Early life
Leather grew up in Newton-le-Willows. He worked for a time at local newspaper The Newton Guardian, the experience inspiring him to write.

Career
Leather began in theatre, with his first play All The Ordinary Angels produced by Manchester’s Royal Exchange Theatre, and later winning the Pearson Award for Best New Play. He would become the Royal Exchange's Playwright-in-Residence. He subsequently moved into radio and then television, writing for series such as Justice, Secrets and Words and Jimmy McGovern's Moving On, as well as multiple episode of Hollyoaks. In 2012, he won the Writer’s Guild Award for Best Episode Of A Continuing Drama for his work on Hollyoaks.

In 2012, he created the children's series Rocket's Island, about a family taking care of foster children at their island farm. It was nominated for a BAFTA children's award in the drama category in 2016 but lost out to the winner Refugee. Leather would alternate between adult and children's drama, writing for McGovern's Broken, and the AppleTV+ thriller Suspicion, as well as The Dumping Ground and The Worst Witch. In 2018, he wrote the television film Mother's Day, based on an infamous IRA bombing attack in Warrington, close to where Leather had grown up and which he had memories of.

In 2021, the BBC commissioned The Control Room, a three part thriller about an Emergency call handler, which would air on BBC One in 2022. Leather was inspired to write the series by a real-life health-scare involving his daughter. It was announced on 8 December 2022 that Leather was writing a six-part thriller for BBC One, Nightsleeper.

References

External links
 

Living people
British soap opera writers
British television writers
British male novelists
British male screenwriters
British male television writers
Year of birth missing (living people)
21st-century British screenwriters